Gianpaolo Grisandi (born 4 December 1964) is an Italian former cyclist. He competed in the team pursuit event at the 1988 Summer Olympics.

References

External links
 

1964 births
Living people
Italian male cyclists
Olympic cyclists of Italy
Cyclists at the 1988 Summer Olympics
Sportspeople from Ravenna
Cyclists from Emilia-Romagna